The Crash Heavyweight Championship is a professional wrestling championship used in the Mexican lucha libre promotion The Crash Lucha Libre based in Tijuana, Baja California. It is the top male championship of the promotion, with both The Crash Cruiserweight Championship and The Crash Junior Championship considered secondary. The first champion was Rey Mysterio, while L.A. Park is the current champion in his first reign.

The championship is designated as a heavyweight title, which means that the championship can officially be competed for only by wrestlers weighing  and above, while in reality it has no lower weight limit. As it was a professional wrestling championship, the championship was not won not by actual competition, but by a scripted ending to a match determined by the bookers and match makers. On occasion the promotion declares a championship vacant, which means there is no champion at that point in time. This can either be due to a storyline, or real life issues such as a champion suffering an injury being unable to defend the championship, or leaving the company.

Title history

Footnotes

References

External links
 The Crash Heavyweight Championship

Heavyweight wrestling championships
The Crash Lucha Libre championships